Derek Martin (born Derek William Rapp; 11 April 1933) is an English former actor. Beginning his career as a stuntman, he moved into acting and played many roles on UK television. One of his most widely known roles is Charlie Slater on the BBC soap opera EastEnders from 2000 to 2011, with brief appearances in 2013 and 2016.

Early life
In his early life Martin worked as a professional gambler, motor racer, at a meat market and as a debt collector. He also performed national service in the Royal Air Force.

Career
Martin started his entertainment career as a stuntman on programmes including Doctor Who, but after breaking his collar bone filming the drama Elizabeth R (1971) he switched to acting. He featured in the BBC television series Paul Temple as well as the ITV television series The Governor. His film appearances include Secrets of a Windmill Girl (1966), The Sex Thief (1973), Eskimo Nell (1975), Sex Express (aka Diversions) (1975), Adventures of a Plumber's Mate (1978), Ragtime (1981), Spaghetti House (1982), and Boston Kickout (1995).

In 1978, he co-starred with Peter Dean in the BBC television series Law & Order, playing Detective Inspector Fred Pyall. From 1981 to 1982, he played Det. Insp. Berwick in two series of the BBC drama The Chinese Detective. In 1982 he became the second actor to take on the role of R. D. Wingfield's fictional Detective Inspector Jack Frost, starring in a BBC radio adaptation of A Touch of Frost. In 1984, he appeared in an episode of season five of Minder. In 1985, he was cast as the star in King and Castle alongside Nigel Planer, which ran for two series until 1988. Devised and co-written by The Sweeney creator Ian Kennedy Martin, Martin played the role of ex policeman Ronald King, now running a debt collection agency in London's East End. He then starred in Eldorado as Alex Morris. He has also made guest appearances in many television programmes, including returning to Doctor Who to play policeman David Mitchell in Image of the Fendahl (1977), The Sweeney episode "Messenger of the Gods" as the villain Spooner, Upstairs, Downstairs, The Bill and Only Fools and Horses. Martin also played himself in an episode of Little Britain.

In September 2000, he started playing Charlie Slater in EastEnders. In April 2010 it was announced that Martin had been cut from the show, along with five other actors. In early 2011 he filmed a guest stint with EastEnders with Charlie due to return for two episodes around April 2011. He returned for another two episodes at Christmas 2013. On 11 February 2015, it was revealed that plans for Martin to make an EastEnders return had been called off, but in October, it was announced Martin would make a brief return for the upcoming Christmas/New Year period. He was written off the show on Thursday, 7 January 2016, in part one of two episodes, in which his character suffered a cardiac arrest.

He also starred in a short film called Piggy Bank in 2004.

In January 2012, he appeared as one of the first five couples in the third series of Celebrity Coach Trip partnering fellow actor John Altman.

Personal life
In February 2010 it was revealed that Martin was due to undergo an operation on his knee, expected to be around May 2010. He said his complaint was due to old age, playing football and carrying meat in an old job at Smithfield Meat Market.

References

External links

Official website

1933 births
Living people
20th-century Royal Air Force personnel
English autobiographers
English male soap opera actors
English stunt performers
Male actors from London
People from Bow, London